A referendum on European Union membership was held in Åland on 20 November 1994. Although a referendum had been held in mainland Finland on 16 October, the islands held a separate vote as they were a separate customs jurisdiction. EU membership was approved by 73.64% of voters.

Results

References

Aland
1994 in Finland
Referendums in Åland
Referendums related to European Union accession
November 1994 events in Europe